Thibaut Collet (born 17 June 1999, in La Tronche) is a French athlete specialising in the pole vault. He won a bronze medal at the 2019 European U23 Championships.

His personal bests are 5.72 metres outdoors (Salon-de-Provence 2021) and 5.81 metres indoors (Miramas 2022).

He and his older brother Mathieu are coached by their father Philippe Collet, himself a former pole vaulter.

International competitions

References

1999 births
Living people
French male pole vaulters
Sportspeople from La Tronche
20th-century French people
21st-century French people